Polje pri Tržišču is a settlement in the Municipality of Sevnica in east-central Slovenia. It lies south of Krmelj in the traditional region of Lower Carniola. The municipality is now included in the Lower Sava Statistical Region.

Name
The name of the settlement was changed from Polje to Polje pri Tržišču in 1953.

References

External links
Polje pri Tržišču at Geopedia

Populated places in the Municipality of Sevnica